Ormaiztegi is a town and municipality located in the comarca of Goierri, Gipuzkoa province, in the autonomous community of the Basque Country, northern Spain. It is also the location of the historical monument, Viaduc d'Ormaiztegi. It is the birthplace of the Carlist hero General Tomas Zumalacarregui.

References

External links
 Official website  
 Ormaiztegi in the Bernardo Estornés Lasa - Auñamendi Encyclopedia (Euskomedia Fundazioa) 

Municipalities in Gipuzkoa